The AFC Cup is an annual continental club football competition organised by the Asian Football Confederation (AFC). Under its current rules, the competition is played primarily between clubs from nations that did not receive direct qualifying slots in the top-tier AFC Champions League, based on the AFC Club Competitions Ranking.

Al-Kuwait SC and Al-Quwa Al-Jawiya are the most successful clubs in the competition's history, having won three titles each. Clubs from Kuwait have won four titles, making them the most successful nation in the competition. Ever since the inauguration of the competition in 2004, the finalists of each edition have been dominated by clubs from West Asia except for 2011 and 2015 when Uzbekistani team FC Nasaf from Central Asia and Malaysian team Johor Darul Ta'zim from Southeast Asia became champions that respective year.

Al-Seeb are the current champions after defeating Kuala Lumpur City in the 2022 final. Since 2021 season the team who won the AFC Cup are granted qualification to in the following season's AFC Champions League qualifying playoffs should they not qualify through  their domestic performance.

History
The AFC Cup began in 2004 as a second-tier competition to relate back to the AFC Champions League as 14 countries that had developing status competed in the first competition with 18 teams being nominated. Group A, B, C had West and Central Asian teams while the other two groups had east and South East Asia. The winners and three runners-up would then head to the knock-out stage where it was a random draw in who was going to play. Al-Jaish took the first AFC Cup after they defeated fellow Syrian opponents Al-Wahda on away goals.

In 2005, 18 teams competed from nine nations with the nations still being allowed to choose from one or two teams entering. After Syrian teams left the AFC Cup to try at the Champions League for four years, Al-Faisaly defeated Nejmeh in the final. With it, Jordanian teams would win the next two AFC Cup seasons with Bahrain joining the league while Bangladesh was relegated to the AFC President's Cup until the tournament's abolition in 2014.

Al-Muharraq would break the trend in 2008 as they competed in the last two-legged final before it headed back into a one-leg system which still runs to this day.

Reform
On 23 December 2022, it was announced that the AFC competition structure would change from the established formats. Under the new plans, the second-tier club competition of Asian football will consist of 32 teams, divided into East and West regions, each with 4 groups of 4 teams, with each team in their group playing each other twice, once home and once away. The top two teams per group advance to the knockout stage, where the round of 16, quarter-finals and semi-finals are held over two legs, with the final to be held in a neutral venue. It is currently unknown when this format will take effect or whether it will have the AFC Cup moniker.

Format

Some changes were applied in terms of teams and format for the 2017 AFC Cup. A total of 36 teams participate in the group stage (12 each from West Asia and ASEAN, and 4 each from East Asia, Central Asia, and South Asia). The final will be played as a one-off match.

Allocation
Teams from 27 AFC countries have reached the group stage of the AFC Cup. The allocation of those teams by member country is listed below; asterisks represent occasions where at least one team was eliminated in qualification for the group stage. 34 AFC countries have had teams participate in qualification (including Brunei and Timor-Leste who made their debuts in 2020), those who have not reached the group stage but have only played in qualification are not bolded.

Prize money

The prize money for the 2021 AFC Cup:

Marketing

Sponsorship
Like the AFC Champions League, the AFC Cup is sponsored by a group of multinational corporations, in contrast to the single main sponsor typically found in national top-flight leagues.

The tournament's current main sponsors are:

 Allianz
 beIN Sports
 China Resources Beverage
 Emirates
 Kärcher
 Nike, Inc.
 Nikon
 QNB Group
 Toyota
 Tsingtao Brewery
 Seiko

Results and statistics

Finals

Performance by clubs

Performance by nations

Top scorers

Most Valuable Player

Winning coaches

All-time top goalscorers

See also 
List of association football competitions
 Bangladeshi clubs in the AFC Cup
Indian clubs in the AFC Cup
 Indonesian clubs in the AFC Cup
 Syrian clubs in the AFC Cup
 Thai clubs in the AFC Cup
 Hong Kong clubs in the AFC Cup
 Vietnamese clubs in the AFC Cup

References

Notes

External links

AFC Cup on RSSSF

 
2
Recurring sporting events established in 2004
2004 establishments in Asia